The Sophomore League was a Class D level minor league baseball league that operated from 1958 through 1961. League franchises were located in New Mexico and Texas. The league evolved from the Southwestern League, which played in 1956 and 1957. The name change was part of a systemic change. The circuit went from being one with almost no ties to major league baseball to a league where every team was a minor league affiliate of a major league team.

History
The Sophomore League formed in 1958 as a six–team league, evolving from the Southwestern League. The Class D level Sophomore League began play on April 28, 1958, with the Artesia Giants (San Francisco Giants affiliate), Carlsbad Potashers (Chicago Cubs), Hobbs Cardinals (St. Louis Cardinals), Midland Braves (Milwaukee Braves), Plainview Athletics (Kansas City Athletics and San Angelo Pirates (Pittsburgh Pirates) as charter members.

The Midland Braves won the Sophomore League championship in 1958, managed in part by Baseball Hall of Fame member Travis Jackson.

The Sophomore League expanded to eight teams in 1959, adding the Alpine Cowboys (Boston Red Sox affiliate) and Odessa Dodgers (Los Angeles Dodgers). On June 9, 1959, the San Angelo Pirates moved to Roswell, New Mexico. The Roswell Pirates finished the season in Roswell. The San Angelo/Roswell Pirates finished 48–77 overall and in last place. The franchise folded after the season. The Alpine Cowboys won the 1959 Sophomore League championship.

Baseball Hall of Fame member Willie Stargell played in the Sophomore League in 1959 for the San Angelo Pirates/Roswell Pirates, his first professional season. Stargell spoke of the difficulties he faced in playing in the league, with the region still having segregated restaurants and hotels. Stargell was threatened at gunpoint on one road trip. At age 19, Stargell hit .275 with 7 home runs and 87 RBI.

As reported in The Sporting News, Carlsbad Potashers player Gil Carter hit a home run in 1959 that was noteworthy due to its distance.
"On a hot August night in 1959, former heavyweight boxer Gil Carter smashed a pitch through Carlsbad's high-elevated air and out of Montgomery Field. The ball carried over the left field wall, soared past two city streets and landed in a peach tree. A newspaper reporter later took an aerial photo from a plane and used the picture to estimate the ball traveled 733 feet. Carter's hometown paper, The Topeka Capital-Journal, said "the blast is considered the longest home run in baseball history."

The official scorer estimated the home run to have traveled 650 feet. However, aerial photographs measurements put the distance at 700–733 feet, which would make it the longest home run ever hit in professional baseball. The ball itself was signed by Carter and he notes the distance of 733 feet.

The Hobbs Pirates won the last two Sophomore League championships in 1960 and 1961.

The Sophomore League presidents were Grady Terry, from 1958 to 1960 and C.F. Montgomery in 1960 and 1961.

Cities represented 
Albuquerque, NM: Albuquerque Dukes 1960–1961
Alpine, TX: Alpine Cowboys 1959–1961 
Artesia, NM: Artesia Giants 1958–1960; Artesia Dodgers 1961 
Carlsbad, NM: Carlsbad Potashers 1958–1961
El Paso, TX: El Paso Sun Kings 1961
Hobbs, NM: Hobbs Cardinals 1958–1959; Hobbs Pirates 1960–1961 
Midland, TX: Midland Braves 1958–1959 
Odessa, TX : Odessa Dodgers 1959–1960 
Plainview, TX: Plainview Athletics 1958–1959 
Roswell, NM:  Roswell Pirates 1959 
San Angelo, TX: San Angelo Pirates 1958–1959

Yearly standings
1958 Sophomore Leagueschedule
Playoff: Midland 3 games, Artesia 1 

 
1959 Sophomore League schedule 
 Playoffs: Alpine 2 games, Hobbs 0; Carlsbad 2 games, Midland 0. Finals: Alpine 2 games, Carlsbad 0.

 
1960 Sophomore League schedule 
 Alpine won the 1st half. Hobbs won the 2nd half.Playoff: Hobbs 2 games, Alpine 1.
 
1961 Sophomore League schedule 
Hobbs won the 1st half. Albuquerque won the 2nd half.Playoff: Hobbs 3 games, Albuquerque 0.

Baseball Hall of Fame alumni 
Travis Jackson, MGR, 1958 Midland Braves
Willie Stargell, 1959 San Angelo Pirates/Roswell Pirates

References 
 McCann, M. (n.d.). Minor League Baseball History. Retrieved April 27, 2007, from https://www.webcitation.org/query?url=http://www.geocities.com/big_bunko/sophomore4761.htm&date=2009-10-25+13:34:15

Defunct minor baseball leagues in the United States
Baseball leagues in Texas
Baseball leagues in New Mexico
Sports leagues established in 1958
Sports leagues disestablished in 1961